Passport to Alcatraz is a 1940 American thriller film directed by Lewis D. Collins and starring Jack Holt, Noah Beery and Cecilia Callejo.

Cast
Jack Holt as George Hollister 
Noah Beery as Ray Nolan 
Cecilia Callejo as Karol Roy 
Maxie Rosenbloom as Hank Kircher 
C. Henry Gordon as Leon Fenten 
Guy Usher as Thomas L. Lindsey - District Attorney 
Clay Clement as Drexel Stuyvesunt 
Ivan Lebedeff as Bogen 
Ben Welden as Bender 
Robert Fiske as Reed 
Harry Cording as Jeffers

References

External links

1940s thriller films
American thriller films
Films directed by Lewis D. Collins
Columbia Pictures films
1940s American films